Gary Howell may refer to:

 Gary Howell (West Virginia politician) (born 1966), member of the West Virginia House of Delegates
 Gary Howell (Michigan politician), member of the Michigan House of Representatives
 Gary Howell (rugby league), (born 1959), Australian rugby league player